Smooth is the self-titled third album by Smooth. It was released on August 1, 1995, by Jive Records and produced by Chris Stokes. Smooth reached No. 35 on the Top R&B/Hip-Hop Albums chart and No. 17 on the Top Heatseekers chart in Billboard Magazine.

The album is best remembered for its controversial lead single "Mind Blowin'" which peaked at No. 75 on the Billboard Hot 100 and No. 7 on the Hot Rap Singles chart. "Undercover Lover" and "Love Groove" were also released as singles.

Track listing
"Mind Blowin'"- 4:16  
"It's Summertime (Let It Get into U)"- 4:03  
"Way Back When"- 4:37  
"Blowin' Up My Pager"- 4:36  
"P.Y.T. (Playa Young Thugs)"- 4:34 (Featuring 2Pac) 
"Swing It to the Left Side"- 4:21  
"Good Stuff"- 4:52  
"Love Groove (Groove with You)"- 4:17  
"Jeeps 'N' Benzos"- 3:37  
"Ghetto Style"- 4:45  
"Undercover Lover"- 6:09  
"Let It Go"- 3:55  
"Mind Blowin'"- 4:10

Samples
It's Summertime (Let It Get Into U)
"Funkin' for Jamaica (N.Y.)" by Tom Browne
Mind Blowin'
"For the Love of You" by The Isley Brothers
"Brazilian Rhyme (Beijo)" by Earth, Wind & Fire

1995 albums
Smooth (singer) albums
Jive Records albums